Asahel Henderson was a member of the Wisconsin State Assembly during the 1874 session. In addition, he chaired the town board (similar to city council) of Beloit (town), Wisconsin. Henderson was a Republican. He was born on October 15, 1815, in Royalton, New York.

References

People from Royalton, New York
People from Beloit, Wisconsin
Republican Party members of the Wisconsin State Assembly
Mayors of places in Wisconsin
Wisconsin city council members
1815 births
Year of death missing